Davorin Marčelja (13 January 1924 – 2 June 2011) was a Croatian athlete. He competed in the men's decathlon at the 1948 Summer Olympics, representing Yugoslavia.

References

1924 births
2011 deaths
Athletes (track and field) at the 1948 Summer Olympics
Croatian decathletes
Yugoslav decathletes
Olympic athletes of Yugoslavia
People from Kastav